The Burma for the Burmans League was a political alliance in Burma.

History
The alliance was formed in August 1928 by opposition parties in the Legislative Council and was largely made up of members of the People's Party and the Karen National Association. However, it had little widespread support and was effectively only a label for the opposition parties.

Prior to the 1932 general elections it formed the basis of the Separation League alliance, which supported separation from India.

References

Defunct political party alliances in Myanmar
1928 establishments in Burma
Political parties established in 1928